Short anagen syndrome is a condition where hair does not grow beyond a short length, due to an unusually short duration of active hair growth (anagen phase). Most cases are associated with fine blond hair.

See also 
 List of cutaneous conditions

References 

Conditions of the skin appendages
Syndromes